The 2012 Hockenheimring GP3 Series round was a GP3 Series motor race held on July 21 and 22, 2012 at Hockenheimring in Hockenheim, Germany. It was the fifth round of the 2012 GP3 Season. The race supported the 2012 German Grand Prix.

Classification

Qualifying

Race 1

Race 2

Standings after the round 

 Drivers' Championship standings

 Teams' Championship standings

 Note: Only the top five positions are included for both sets of standings.

See also 
 2012 German Grand Prix
 2012 Hockenheimring GP2 Series round

References

Hockenheim
GP3